Transcription factor GATA-4 is a protein that in humans is encoded by the GATA4 gene.

Function 

This gene encodes a member of the GATA family of zinc finger transcription factors. Members of this family recognize the GATA motif which is present in the promoters of many genes. This protein is thought to regulate genes involved in embryogenesis and in myocardial differentiation and function. Mutations in this gene have been associated with cardiac septal defects as well as reproductive defects.

GATA4 is a critical transcription factor for proper mammalian cardiac development and essential for survival of the embryo. GATA4 works in combination with other essential cardiac transcription factors as well, such as Nkx2-5 and Tbx5. GATA4 is expressed in both embryo and adult cardiomyocytes where it functions as a transcriptional regulator for many cardiac genes, and also regulates hypertrophic growth of the heart. GATA4 promotes cardiac morphogenesis, cardiomyocytes survival, and maintains cardiac function in the adult heart.
Mutations or defects in the GATA4 gene can lead to a variety of cardiac problems including congenital heart disease, abnormal ventral folding, and defects in the cardiac septum separating the atria and ventricles, and hypoplasia of the ventricular myocardium. As seen from the abnormalities from deletion of GATA4, it is essential for cardiac formation and the survival of the embryo during fetal development.
GATA4 is not only important for cardiac development, but also development and function of the mammalian fetal ovary and contributes to fetal male gonadal development and mutations may lead to defects in reproductive development. GATA4 has also been discovered to have an integral role in controlling the early stages of pancreatic and hepatic development.

GATA4 is regulated through the autophagy-lysosome pathway in eukaryotic cells. In cellular senescence, ATM and ATR inhibit p62, an autophagy adaptor responsible for selective autophagy of GATA4. Inhibition of p62 leads to increased GATA4 levels, resulting in NF-kB activation and subsequent SASP induction.

Atrioventricular valve formation 

GATA4 expression during cardiac development has been shown to be essential to proper atrioventricular (AV) formation and function. Endocardial cells undergo epithelial to mesenchymal transitions (EMT) into the AV cushions during development. Their proliferation and fusion leads to division of the ventricular inlet into two different passageways with two AV valves, and they are thought to be under the influence of the GATA4 transcription factor. GATA4 inactivation, with GATA4-null mice, leads to down regulation of Erbb3 and altered Erk expression, two other important molecules in EMT and ventricular inlet separation. This has been shown to lead to pericardial effusion and peripheral hemorrhage in E12.5 mice, which succumb due to heart failure before weaning age. This data could have important implications for human medicine by suggesting that mutations with the GATA4 transcription factor could be responsible for AV cushion defects in humans with improper septal formation leading to congenital heart disease.

Interactions
GATA4 has been shown to interact with NKX2-5, TBX5, Serum response factor HAND2, and  HDAC2.

GATA4 has also been shown to interact with Erbb3, FOG-1, and FOG-2.

Clinical relevance
Mutations in this gene have been associated to cases of congenital diaphragmatic hernia. Atrial septal defects, tetralogy of Fallot, and ventricular septal defects associated with GATA4 mutation were also seen in South Indian patients.

See also
 GATA transcription factor

References

Further reading

External links 
 
 

Transcription factors